Masyaf Subdistrict  is a Syrian nahiyah (subdistrict) located in Masyaf District in Hama.  According to the Syria Central Bureau of Statistics (CBS), Masyaf Subdistrict had a population of 68184 in the 2004 census.

References 

Masyaf
Masyaf District